Hartstein is a surname. Notable people with the surname include:

 Bernd Hartstein (1947–2002), German sport shooter
 Gary Hartstein (born 1955), American professor of Anesthesia and Emergency Medicine
 Roy Hart, born Rubin Hartstein (1926–1975), South African actor
 Roy S. Harte, né Hartstein, (1924–2003), American jazz drummer

German-language surnames